Nuclear respiratory factor 1, also known as Nrf1, Nrf-1, NRF1 and NRF-1, encodes a protein that homodimerizes and functions as a transcription factor which activates the expression of some key metabolic genes regulating cellular growth and nuclear genes required for respiration, heme biosynthesis, and mitochondrial DNA transcription and replication. The protein has also been associated with the regulation of neurite outgrowth. Alternate transcriptional splice variants, which encode the same protein, have been characterized. Additional variants encoding different protein isoforms have been described but they have not been fully characterized. Confusion has occurred in bibliographic databases due to the shared symbol of NRF1 for this gene and for "nuclear factor (erythroid-derived 2)-like 1" which has an official symbol of NFE2L1.

Function 
Nrf1 functions as a transcription factor that activates the expression of some key metabolic genes regulating cellular growth and nuclear genes required for mitochondrial respiration, and mitochondrial DNA transcription and replication. Nrf1, together with Nrf2, mediates the biogenomic coordination between nuclear and mitochondrial genomes by directly regulating the expression of several nuclear-encoded ETC proteins, and indirectly regulating the three mitochondrial-encoded COX subunit genes by activating mtTFA, mtTFB1, and mtTFB2.

Nrf1 is associated with the regulation of neurite outgrowth.

Alternate transcriptional splice variants, which encode the same protein, have been characterized. Additional variants encoding different protein isoforms have been described but they have not been fully characterized.

Cyclin D1-dependent kinase, through phosphorylating NRF-1 at S47, coordinates nuclear DNA synthesis and mitochondrial function.

Interactions 
NRF1 has been shown to interact with DYNLL1, PPARGC1A, and PPRC1.

References

Further reading

External links 
 
 

Transcription factors